The Etrich Sport-Taube was a one-off, single engine, one seat monoplane, built in Czechoslovakia in 1929.

Design and development
The Sport-Taube was a plane built and designed by Igo Etrich, the famous builder of the Etrich Taube. It was originally intended as a Volksflugzeug, a low-cost airplane. However, it faced difficulties regarding production in series and the project was given up.

After World War I, Etrich moved to Trautenau, now Trutnov, in the newly founded Czechoslovakia. He built the Sport-Taube, a closed-cockpit monoplane, in the same factory where he built textile machinery. The original plane is now displayed suspended from the roof at the National Technical Museum in Prague, Czech Republic.

The Sport-Taube was powered by a  engine.

Operational history
Although the Sport-Taube was intended to be commercialized as a private aircraft, with its  engine it was deemed to be faster than the planes of the Czechoslovak Air Force at that time. Thus the Czech authorities made difficulties to the Etrich company to obtain the permits that were necessary for mass production of the plane, claiming that the plane could be used for smuggling. Disappointed, Igo Etrich abandoned his aeronautical projects and dedicated himself fully to the production of textile machinery.

Specifications

See also

References

External links

British Industria History - Igo Etrich

1920s Czechoslovakian sport aircraft
High-wing aircraft
Single-engined tractor aircraft
Aircraft first flown in 1929